A Decent Adultery (Spanish:Un adulterio decente) is a 1969 Spanish comedy film directed by Rafael Gil and starring Carmen Sevilla, Fernando Fernán Gómez and Manolo Gómez Bur.

Cast
 Carmen Sevilla as Fernanda  
 Fernando Fernán Gómez as Dr. Leopoldo Cumberri  
 Manolo Gómez Bur as Melecio  
 Don Jaime de Mora y Aragón as Eduardo Bernal  
 Andrés Pajares as Federico Latorre  
 José Orjas as Eladio  
 Guadalupe Muñoz Sampedro as Baruti  
 Matilde Muñoz Sampedro as Magdalena  
 Mary Begoña as Emiliana Regueiro  
 Venancio Muro as Raigoso  
 María Isbert as Antonia  
 Julio Riscal as Paco  
 Rosa Palomar as Patro  
 Manuel Alexandre as Joaquín Renovales  
 Erasmo Pascual as Dr. Fernández  
 Maribel Hidalgo as Margarita  
 Rafael Hernández as Fermín  
 Vicente Haro as Galán  
 Mónica Randall as Pupé  
 José Alfayate as Bartolomé Ortigueira 
 Francisco Rabal as Conserje  
 Rafael J. Salvia as Dr. González  
 Miguel Utrillo as Doctor 3

References

Bibliography
 Mira, Alberto. The A to Z of Spanish Cinema. Rowman & Littlefield, 2010.

External links 

1969 films
1969 comedy films
Spanish comedy films
1960s Spanish-language films
Films directed by Rafael Gil
Films with screenplays by Rafael J. Salvia
1960s Spanish films